The 1942 All-Ireland Senior Football Championship Final was the 55th All-Ireland Final and the deciding match of the 1942 All-Ireland Senior Football Championship, an inter-county Gaelic football tournament for the top teams in Ireland.

Match

Summary
Paddy O'Connor goaled for Dublin in the 10th minute, and five late points gave them a narrow victory, their first title in nineteen years. Bobby Beggs of the Dublin team beat his former team of Galway, having won an All-Ireland medal with them in 1938 and being on the Dublin team losing to Galway in the 1934 final.

Dublin's first All-Ireland football title since 1923, brought to an end a 19-year barren spell for the county, rivalled only by their team of the late 1990s and 2000s.

This was the third of three consecutive All-Ireland football finals lost by Galway, following defeats to Kerry at the final hurdle in 1940 and 1941.

With their 1940 win, Kerry had reached 14 All-Ireland titles, drawing level with Dublin. Dublin had been in the lead since 1892. In 1941, Kerry would take the lead; Dublin's 1942 win equalled the new total but never again did Dublin manage to surpass Kerry's total.

Details

|* = Note the same score was repeated in 1983.

References

All-Ireland Senior Football Championship Final
All-Ireland Senior Football Championship Final, 1942
All-Ireland Senior Football Championship Finals
Dublin county football team matches
Galway county football team matches